Woolstore or Woolstores may refer to:

 Australian Mercantile Land & Finance Woolstores, Brisbane, Queensland, Australia
 Elder Smith Woolstore, Teneriffe, Brisbane, Queensland, Australia
 Fremantle Woolstores
 Goldsbrough Mort Woolstore, Brisbane, Queensland, Australia
 Mactaggarts Woolstore, Brisbane, Queensland, Australia
 Queensland Primary Producers No 4 Woolstore, Brisbane, Queensland, Australia
 The Old Woolstore Apartment Hotel, Hobart
 Winchcombe Carson Woolstores, Brisbane, Queensland, Australia

See also
Australian Estates No. 1 Store, Brisbane, Queensland, Australia
Australian Estates No. 2 Store, Brisbane, Queensland, Australia
 Goldsbrough Mort Building, Rockhampton, Queensland, Australia
 Teneriffe Village, Brisbane, Queensland, Australia